The 1972 U.S. Pro Tennis Championships was a men's tennis tournament played on outdoor hard courts at the Longwood Cricket Club in Boston, United States and was part of the 1972 World Championship Tennis circuit. It was the 45th edition of the tournament and was held from August 7 through August 13, 1972.

Draw

Finals

Top half

Bottom half

References

U.S. Pro Tennis Championships
US Pro Championships